Dominic Thiem defeated Alexander Zverev in the final, 2–6, 4–6, 6–4, 6–3, 7–6(8–6) to win the men's singles tennis title at the 2020 US Open. It was his first major title, following three previous runner-up finishes. Thiem became the first man to come back from two sets down in a US Open final in the Open Era, the first to do so overall since 1949, and the first to do so in any major final since Gastón Gaudio at the 2004 French Open. Both players served for the championship in the final set (Zverev at 5–3 and Thiem at 6–5), but both were broken at 30. This was the first time in history that the US Open title was decided by a fifth set tie-break, 50 years after the rule was introduced in 1970.

Thiem's victory made him the first Austrian to win a singles major since Thomas Muster at the 1995 French Open, the first man born in the 1990s to win a singles major, and the first new male major singles champion since Marin Čilić won the 2014 US Open. The gap between Čilić and Thiem's titles was the longest between two new major singles champions in the history of men's tennis, surpassing the previous longest gap between Juan Martín del Potro and Andy Murray respectively at the 2009 and 2012 editions of the US Open.

Zverev became the youngest male finalist at a major championship since Novak Djokovic at the 2010 US Open.

Rafael Nadal was the reigning champion, but chose not to participate due to both safety concerns related to the ongoing COVID-19 pandemic and the short amount of time between the US Open and the rescheduled European clay season. This marked the first time since the 1999 US Open that both Nadal and Roger Federer (who was recovering from a knee surgery) were absent from a major.

There were no qualifiers this year. The ATP rankings valid on August 3 (being the rankings from March 16) were used to determine the main-draw entry list.

World No. 1 Novak Djokovic was disqualified from the tournament during his fourth-round match against Pablo Carreño Busta. After being broken to trail 6–5 in the first set, Djokovic frustratedly hit a ball towards the baseline. This ball accidentally hit a lineswoman in the throat. Djokovic's unbeaten 26–0 2020 season, as well as his 29-match winning streak (extending back to the 2019 Davis Cup Finals), ended as a result. Djokovic became the first player to be defaulted from a major since Stefan Koubek at the 2000 French Open.

Djokovic's ejection from the tournament guaranteed a maiden major finalist in the top half of the draw. His disqualification also meant this would be the first major since the 2004 French Open not to feature either Djokovic, Federer or Nadal in the semifinals, the first major since the 2003 Wimbledon Championships in which none of the quarterfinalists had previously won a major, and the first major men's singles tournament not to have been won by Djokovic, Federer or Nadal since Stan Wawrinka in the 2016 US Open final. This also guaranteed a maiden major champion in men's singles for the first time since the 2014 tournament, when Čilić defeated fellow first-time finalist Kei Nishikori in straight sets. Additionally, it meant this would be the first major won by someone under the age of 30 since the 2016 Wimbledon Championships. For the first time in major history, all of the male quarterfinalists were born in the 1990s.

Seeds
All seedings per ATP rankings.

Draw

Finals

Top half

Section 1

Section 2

Section 3

Section 4

Bottom half

Section 5

Section 6

Section 7

Section 8

Players

Seeded players

Other entry information

Wild cards

Protected ranking
  Andrey Kuznetsov (130)
  Mackenzie McDonald (83)
  Jack Sock (119)

Alternates
  Ernesto Escobedo
  Marcel Granollers (withdrew due to focus on doubles)

Withdrawals

 – not included on entry list& – withdrew from entry list
Rank date: March 16, 2020

Notes

References

External links
2020 US Open – Men's draws and results at the International Tennis Federation

Men's Singles
US Open - Men's Singles
US Open (tennis) by year – Men's singles